John Henry Olsen AO OBE (born 21 January 1928) is an Australian artist and winner of the 2005 Archibald Prize. Olsen's primary subject of work is landscape.

Early life and training

John Olsen was born in Newcastle on 21 January 1928. He moved to Bondi Beach with his family in 1935 and began a lifelong fascination with Sydney Harbour. He attended St Joseph's College, Hunters Hill. After leaving school in 1943, he went to the Dattillo Rubbo Art School in 1947 and from 1950 to 1953 studied at the Julian Ashton Art School in Sydney, and Auburn School from 1950 to 1956. In 1957, Sydney business man, Robert Shaw and his then wife, Annette, supported by art critic Paul Haefliger sponsored John Olsen to go to Europe and paint. After visiting London and Cornwall in England, he left for Europe. Olsen studied printmaking at Stanley William Hayter's Atelier 17 etching studio in Paris in 1957, followed by two years in Deià Spain. Olsen sent works back from Spain for his first solo exhibition at Macquarie Galleries Sydney 6–8 August 1958. In the exhibition catalogue artist's statement, Olsen referred to Paul Klee's maxim of 'taking the line for a holiday.' Olsen returned to Sydney in 1960 and began teaching at East Sydney Technical Collage (now the National Art School) where he had also studied.

In Deià, Olsen learnt to cook from Elizabeth David's A Book of Mediterranean Food, instilling a life-long love affair with cooking and food. He also worked for brief periods in both Ibiza and Deià, as an apprentice chef. During this period, he was influenced by the Taochist artists Antoni Tàpies and Jean Dubuffet, the CoBrA group and Miró. He also developed an interest in Eastern philosophy (specifically D.T. Suzuki's Zen and Japanese Culture and Eugen Herrigel's Zen in the Art of Archery) and poetry through his friendship with poet, Robert Graves, which has continued to inspire his work.

In 1968, Olsen set up and ran the Bakery Art School and in 1970, he was commissioned by the Sir William Dobell Art Foundation to paint a large mural entitled, 'Salute to Five Bells', which was inspired by Kenneth Slessor's poem and completed in 1973. Olsen's work has been marked by a deep engagement with the Australian landscape and he has lived for long periods in different parts of the country and travelled widely in it. He has served on the boards of the Art Gallery of New South Wales and the National Art Gallery.

Art works 
In 1960, Olsen painted Spanish Encounter which was acquired by the Art Gallery of NSW and exhibited at Terry Clune Galleries in Sydney. In the early 1960s, Olsen began painting ceilings, the first, 'Summer in the You Beaut Country', a commission from art dealer, Frank McDonald, followed by 'Darlinghurst Cats', 'Sea Sun and Five Bells' (gifted to the Newcastle Art Gallery in 2011 by Ann Lewis, AO) and 'Life Burst' (commissioned by Thelma Clune, also in the Newcastle Art Gallery). 'Le Soleil' and 'La Primavera' were exhibited at Clune Galleries, with 'Sydney Sun' (as 'King Sun') exhibited at South Yarra Gallery, Melbourne in 1965.

His artworks include the Lake Eyre and frogs series. He is a regular visitor to Lake Eyre, in 2011 he had been invited to be a member of the party in which Paul Lockyer and two other ABC employees died in a helicopter crash at the lake, but declined due to ill-health. He later offered a painting and a poem in memory of those killed.  Andrew Taylor, "I was meant to be on that helicopter, says Olsen", Sydney Morning Herald, 21 August 2011. Retrieved 8 December 2017  .

More recent works include Golden Summer, Clarendon. One of Olsen's most successful murals, Salute to Five Bells, is currently in the Sydney Opera House. Although he has been labelled as an abstract artist, Olsen rejects this label, stating, "I have never painted an abstract painting in my life". He describes his work as "an exploration of the totality of landscape". Olsen published his diaries, under the title 'Drawn From Life', in 1997. Olsen's book My Salute to Five Bells which contains the artist's thoughts, diary entries and his original drawing for the work, was published by the National Library of Australiain 2015.

Olsen is well known for his paintings of frogs and for including frogs in many of his works. In 2013, he began work on his largest painting since Salute to Five Bells. Eight metres by six metres wide, on eight panels, The King Sun was hung in Collins Square in the Melbourne Docklands. The work depicts a brilliant Australian sun (including three frogs). Olsen and his work on the mural are the subject of 2014 documentary The King Sun, directed by New Zealander Tony Williams.

Awards 
In Australia's New Year's Honours of 1977, Olsen was appointed an Officer of the Order of the British Empire, in 1993 he was awarded an Australian Creative Fellowship and in the Australia Day Honours of 2001 he was appointed an Officer of the Order of Australia. He was awarded the Centenary Medal on 1 January 2001.

Early awards included the 1960 Rockdale Art Award, Arncliffe, the 1961 H.C. Richards Memorial Prize, Queensland Art Gallery, for 'Journey into you Beaut Country No 2', awarded by the judge of the competition, Russell Drysdale, the Perth Prize and the Royal Easter Show A.E. Armstrong Art Prize for 'People who live in Victoria Street' exhibited as 'Painting' NFS. In 1964 he was awarded the Launceston Art Purchase Exhibition Prize, Tasmania with 'Me, the Gardener'.

He was also awarded the Wynne Prize in both 1969 for 'The Chasing Bird Landscape' (1969) and 1985 for 'A Road to Clarendon: Autumn' (1985). In 1989, Olsen won the Sulman (the Sir John Sulman Prize) with his work "Don Quixote enters the Inn"

He won the 2005 Archibald Prize for his portrait Self portrait Janus Faced.

Exhibitions
Olsen's works have been exhibited at numerous solo and group shows across Australia and internationally.

 2016 John Olsen: The You Beaut Country, National Gallery of Victoria, Melbourne (16 September 2016 – 12 February 2017)

Collections 
John Olsen's work is represented in all Australian state gallery collections (the Art Gallery of New South Wales, 131 works), the National Gallery of Australia, Canberra and regional galleries Australia wide. Including Newcastle Art Gallery which holds several important works.

Family and personal life
John Olsen lives near Bowral, New South Wales. In 1962, he married fellow artist Valerie Strong. Daughter Jane Olsen (with first wife Mary Flower), died in 2009. John Olsen was married to his third wife, artist Noela Hjorth until 1986 and married his fourth wife, Katharine Howard, in 1989. Katharine Howard died in 2016. Son of the Brush is a 2020 memoir by Tim Olsen about his life as the son of artist John Olsen.

Daughter Louise Olsen is a co-founder of cult Australian fashion jewellery label Dinosaur Designs

References

Bibliography

External links
John Olsen on Artabase
National Gallery Victoria John Olsen
Art Gallery of New South Wales Collection: John Olsen

1928 births
Archibald Prize winners
Australian contemporary painters
Living people
Officers of the Order of Australia
Australian Officers of the Order of the British Empire
Recipients of the Centenary Medal
People from Bowral
National Art School alumni
Australian landscape painters
Wynne Prize winners
Julian Ashton Art School alumni
Australian portrait painters